Incourt may refer to:
 Incourt, Belgium, a municipality in the province of Walloon Brabant
 Incourt, Pas-de-Calais, a commune of the Pas-de-Calais department in northern France